SA Roquette Frères v Council (1980) Case 138/79 is an EU law case, concerning the free movement of services in the European Union.

Facts
The Council sent proposal to European Parliament in March 1979 (when the Parliament still only had a consulting role) regarding a measure that was to come into force on 1 July 1979. It asked for a reply in April. The Parliament rejected it, meaning the proposal was to go back to committee for reconsideration. This would take longer than April. The Parliament would have convened an extraordinary session, but Council made no request, and purported to adopt the measure on 25 June 1979 against the Parliament's wishes. The measure was challenged by a company, SA Roquette Frères, on the ground that the European Parliament was not properly consulted.

Judgment
The Court of Justice held consulting required more steps than the Council had taken. The measure was void because Council should have requested the extraordinary session of the Parliament.

See also

European Union law

Notes

References

European Union services case law
European Parliament